Grace Obour (born 13 May 2001) is a Ghanaian track and field sprinter. She won a bronze medal at the 2019 African Games.

Grace Obour gained her first international experience at the 2019 African Youth Championships in Abidjan.

In August she reached the semi-finals at the African Games in Rabat in the 200 metres, in which she was eliminated. She won the bronze medal behind Galefele Moroko and Favor Ofili  over 400 meters in 51.86 s.

She competes for University of Ghana.

References 

2001 births
Living people
Ghanaian female sprinters
African Games bronze medalists for Ghana
African Games medalists in athletics (track and field)
Athletes (track and field) at the 2019 African Games
University of Ghana alumni